The Professional Footballers' Association Women's Players' Player of the Year is an annual award given to the player who is voted to have been the best of the year in English women's football. The award has been presented since the 2012–13 season and the winner is chosen by a vote amongst the members of the players' trade union, the Professional Footballers' Association (PFA). The current holder is Sam Kerr who won the award on 9 June 2022. The first winner of the award was Arsenal midfielder Kim Little in 2013.

Every spring, each member of the association votes for two players.  A shortlist of nominees is published in April and the winner of the award, along with the winners of the PFA's other annual awards, is announced at a gala event in London a few days later.

Winners
The women's award has been presented since 2013 while the men's PFA Players' Player of the Year has been awarded since 1974. The table below also indicates where the winning player also won one or more of the other major "player of the year" awards in English women's football, namely the FWA Women's Footballer of the Year (FWA), PFA Fans' Women's Player of the Year award (FPY), and the PFA Women's Young Player of the Year award.

Breakdown of winners

By country

By club

See also

 List of sports awards honoring women

References

External links
 

English women's football trophies and awards
Awards established in 2013
2013 establishments in England
Annual events in England
Annual sporting events in the United Kingdom
English football trophies and awards
England 2
Women's association football player of the year awards